Blondes for Export is a 1950 West German crime thriller film directed by Eugen York and starring Lotte Koch, Catja Görna and René Deltgen. Norbert Jacques wrote the screenplay, adapting his own novel. It was shot at the Göttingen Studios and on location around Hamburg. The film's sets were designed by the art director Hans Ledersteger and Ernst Richter.

Cast
 Lotte Koch as Yvonne Moréen
 Catja Görna as Iris Gorla
 René Deltgen as Frank Olman
 Albrecht Schoenhals as Gorla
 Peter van Eyck as Rolf Carste
 Ursula Grabley as Emmi Kruschke
 Ursula Herking as Fräulein Lührs
 Änne Bruck as Frau Hessling
 Carl-Heinz Schroth as Roschek
 Albert Florath as Professor
 Hans Leibelt as Intendant Hallerstedt
 Hans Richter as Artist Freddie
 Franz Schafheitlin as Polizeikommissar in Rio
 Josef Dahmen as Armand
 Peter Mosbacher as Alvaro
 Just Scheu as Direktor bei Lloyds
 Theo Pöppinghaus as Aldo
 Erich Weiher as Polizeibeamter
 Joachim Rake as Perreira
 Theo Tecklenburg as Südländer

See also
 The Bordello in Rio (1927)
 White Cargo (1937)
  (1958)
 Final Destination: Red Lantern (1960)

References

Bibliography 
 Hans-Michael Bock and Tim Bergfelder. The Concise Cinegraph: An Encyclopedia of German Cinema. Berghahn Books, 2009.
 Thomas Elsaesser & Michael Wedel. The BFI companion to German cinema. British Film Institute, 1999.

External links 
 

1950 films
1950s crime thriller films
German crime thriller films
West German films
1950s German-language films
Films directed by Eugen York
Remakes of German films
Films about prostitution in Germany
Films about prostitution in Brazil
German black-and-white films
1950s German films
Films shot in Hamburg
Films shot at Göttingen Studios